Charles Wirgman (31 August 1832 - 8 February 1891) was an English artist and cartoonist, the creator of the Japan Punch and illustrator in China and Meiji period-Japan for the Illustrated London News.

Wirgman was the eldest son of Ferdinand Charles Wirgman (1806–57) and brother of Theodore Blake Wirgman. He married Ozawa Kane in 1863, and the couple had one son.

Wirgman arrived in Japan in 1861 as a correspondent for the Illustrated London News, and resided in Yokohama from 1861 until his death. He published the first magazine in Japan, the Japan Punch, monthly between 1862 and spring 1887.  Like its  British namesake, the magazine was written in a humorous, often satirical manner, and was illustrated with Wirgman's cartoons. 

Wirgman formed a partnership called "Beato & Wirgman, Artists and Photographers" with Felice Beato from 1864 to 1867. Wirgman again produced illustrations derived from Beato's photographs while Beato photographed some of Wirgman's sketches and other works. 

Wirgman taught western-style drawing and painting techniques to a number of Japanese artists, possibly including the ukiyo-e artist Kobayashi Kiyochika. From 1865 he had Goseda Yoshimatsu and Kanō Tomonobu as his pupils. In 1866 he taught Takahashi Yuichi, sponsoring his work for the International Exposition of 1867. He also was briefly an English tutor, most notably to the future Admiral Tōgō, then a young cadet.

In the 1860s, he accompanied British envoy Sir Ernest Satow on a number of journeys around Japan as described in Satow's Diplomat in Japan.

Wirgman's grave is in the Yokohama Foreign General Cemetery.

See also
Anglo-Japanese relations
Georges Ferdinand Bigot

References

 The Genius of Mr. Punch: Life in Yokohama's Foreign Settlement: Charles Wirgman and the Japan Punch, 1862-1887, compiled and annotated by Jozef Rogala, Translations by Hitomi Yamashita, Yurindo Co. Ltd, Yokohama 2004.

External links

Japan and the Illustrated London News - lecture to the Japan Society by Terry Bennett.

1832 births
1891 deaths
British expatriates in Japan
British people of the Second Opium War
English cartoonists
Culture in Yokohama
History of mass media in Japan
Japanese cartoonists